Asociación Deportiva Municipal de Pérez Zeledón is a Costa Rican football team playing at the top level in the Primera División de Costa Rica.

It is based in San Isidro de El General.  Their home stadium is Estadio Municipal Pérez Zeledón. Their nickname is Guerreros del Sur or The Southern Warriors.

History
Municipal Pérez Zeledón was founded in 1962 and they reached the Second Division in 1976.

A.D. Generaleña and A.D. Pérez Zeledón merger
In 1988, Asociación Deportiva Municipal Generaleña won promotion to the Primera Division and in 1991 a second team from Pérez Zeledón, Asociación Deportiva Pérez Zeledón, also clinched the second division title, prompting to merge the teams into Asociación Deportiva Municipal de Pérez Zeledón which would go and represent the canton in the top tier. In 2010, Puma Generaleña was founded as successor to AD Generaleña.

2004 Apertura champions
The team were surprise winners of the 2004–05 Apertura in the Primera División, their first and only title so far, under the coaching of Carlos Restrepo against Saprissa defeated them on their own home stadium 0–1. Although, they missed out on the overall championship title, losing against Alajuelense 1–4 on aggregate.
Club top goalscorer that season was Ever Alfaro, also in the team were William Sunsing and Géiner Segura, they were both part of the Ticos along their path to 2006's World Cup held in Germany.

Honours
 Primera División de Costa Rica: 1
Champions: Apertura 2017

Current squad
As of February 8, 2023

Championship Apertura 2017
List of players and coaching staff who won the Apertura 2017 National Soccer Championship of Costa Rica First Division, by defeating Club Sport Herediano on December 20, 2017.

Couching staff

Coach= José Giacone Garita

Attached= Omar Royero Gutiérrez & José Carlos Cancela Durán

Goalkeepers= Giovanny Chacón Obando

Physio= Andres Mata Leiva

Doctor= William Cruz Umaña

Props= Melvin Bonilla Villalobos

References

External links
  Official Website of Municipal Perez Zeledon,  Costa Rica
 Pérez Zeledon – Info del cantón
 First online website of  Perez Zeledon,  Costa Rica, since 2002
 Official website of  Perez Zeledon,  Costa Rica
 Official English News and Information Site for Perez Zeledon

 
Football clubs in Costa Rica
Association football clubs established in 1962
1962 establishments in Costa Rica